Klaus Francke (17 July 1936 – 28 June 2020) was a German politician of the Christian Democratic Union (CDU) and former member of the German Bundestag.

Life 
Francke joined the Junge Union and the CDU in 1956, and from 1964 to 1989 he was district chairman of the Hamburg-Wandsbek CDU district association and a member of the state executive board. From 1966 to 1978 he was a member of the Hamburg parliament. He was a member of the German Bundestag from 1976 to 1998, and on 7 November 2001 he again succeeded Gunnar Uldall in Parliament until 2002.

References

External links 

1936 births
2020 deaths
Members of the Bundestag for Hamburg
Members of the Bundestag 1998–2002
Members of the Bundestag 1994–1998
Members of the Bundestag 1990–1994
Members of the Bundestag 1987–1990
Members of the Bundestag 1983–1987
Members of the Bundestag 1980–1983
Members of the Bundestag 1976–1980
Members of the Bundestag for the Christian Democratic Union of Germany
Members of the Hamburg Parliament